Bernard "Bernie" Marcus (born May 12, 1929) is an American billionaire businessman. He co-founded The Home Depot and was the company's first CEO, and chairman until retiring in 2002.

Early life and education
Bernard Marcus was born to Russian Jewish immigrant parents in Newark, New Jersey. He was the youngest of four children and grew up in a tenement. He graduated from South Side High School in 1947. Marcus wanted to become a doctor, and was accepted to Harvard Medical School, but could not afford the tuition. He graduated from Rutgers University with a pharmacy degree. While there he joined the Alpha Epsilon Pi fraternity.

Career
Marcus worked at a drugstore as a pharmacist but became more interested in the retailing side of the business. He worked at a cosmetics company and various other retail jobs, eventually reaching a position as CEO of Handy Dan Improvement Centers, a Los Angeles-based chain of home improvement stores. In 1978, both he and future  Home Depot co-founder Arthur Blank were fired during a corporate power struggle at Handy Dan.

In 1978, they co-founded the home-improvement retailer The Home Depot, with the help of merchandising expert Pat Farrah and New York investment banker Ken Langone who assembled a group of investors. The first two stores opened on June 22, 1979 in Atlanta.

The store revolutionized the home improvement business with its warehouse concept. Blank, Marcus, and Langone became billionaires. Marcus served as the company's first CEO for 19 years and also served as chairman of the board until his retirement in 2002. Marcus was inducted into the Junior Achievement U.S. Business Hall of Fame in 2006.

Marcus is one of several business tycoons who opposed the Employee Free Choice Act, a controversial proposal they claim gives unfair advantage to labor unions. The EFCA would outlaw conducting employee union votes with secret ballots while allowing fines and injunctions when employees show they are being punished for union activity on the job.

In 2010, Marcus founded the Job Creators Network, a conservative advocacy group, with $500,000 in seed funding.

In 2015, Marcus donated $1.5 million to Super PACs supporting Jeb Bush and Scott Walker. On June 1, 2016, Marcus publicly announced his support for Republican presumptive presidential nominee Donald Trump. He was one of Trump's largest donors, giving $7 million to his campaign. When Marcus announced in 2019 that he would financially support the Donald Trump 2020 presidential campaign, it triggered calls for a boycott of Home Depot even though Marcus was no longer with the company.

In a June 2019 interview, Marcus said most of his wealth is in Home Depot stock.

Philanthropy
Marcus is a longtime philanthropist who plans to give away 90% of his $5.9 billion fortune to charity. Bernie and Billi Marcus are signatories of The Giving Pledge, a commitment to give away the majority of their wealth to philanthropic causes. As of 2019, he has given away $2 billion to various philanthropic causes and has pledged to give away most of his $5.9 billion fortune.

Marcus is chairman of the Marcus Foundation, whose focuses include children, medical research, free enterprise, military veterans, Jewish causes and the community. Marcus is on the Board of Directors and an active volunteer for the Shepherd Center. One of his main initiatives is providing care for war veterans with traumatic brain injuries.

In May 2005, Marcus was awarded the Others Award by the Salvation Army, its highest honor.

He was named a Georgia Trustee in 2009. The award is given by the Georgia Historical Society, in conjunction with the Governor of Georgia, to individuals whose accomplishments and community service reflect the ideals of the founding body of Trustees, which governed the Georgia colony from 1732 to 1752. In 2012, Marcus was awarded the William E. Simon Prize for Philanthropic Leadership.

Causes

Jewish and Israeli
Marcus co-founded the Israel Democracy Institute in 1991, contributing $5 million for the construction of the institute's building in Jerusalem's Talbiya neighborhood and investing hundreds of millions of shekels in its ongoing operation over the years. In 2016, Marcus and his wife Billi donated $25 million to the construction of the $133 million MDA Marcus National Blood Services Centre in Israel.

The Georgia Aquarium
Marcus heavily contributed to the launch of the Georgia Aquarium, which opened in downtown Atlanta, Georgia, in 2005. Based mostly on the $250 million donation for the Aquarium, Marcus and his wife, Billi, were listed among the top charitable donors in the country by The Chronicle of Philanthropy in 2005.

Medical research
Marcus funded and founded The Marcus Institute, a center for the provision of services for children and adolescents with developmental disabilities. Marcus founded and donated $25 million to Autism Speaks to spearhead its efforts to raise money for research on the causes and cure for autism. He is an active member of the board of directors.

Books
In 1999, Marcus, along with Arthur Blank and Bob Andelman, wrote the book Built from Scratch: How a Couple of Regular Guys Grew The Home Depot from Nothing to $30 Billion.

Marcus, with Catherine Lewis, wrote a book titled Kick Up Some Dust: Lessons on Thinking, Giving Back and Doing It Yourself. The book debuted at The Book Festival of the Marcus Jewish Community Center of Atlanta (MJCCA) on November 6, 2022.

Personal life
Marcus has been married twice. He has two children with his first wife, Ruth: Frederick Marcus and Susanne Marcus Collins. With his second wife, Billi, he has a stepson, Michael Morris.

References

Further reading

1929 births
American billionaires
American people of Russian-Jewish descent
American retail chief executives
Businesspeople from Atlanta
Georgia (U.S. state) Republicans
Giving Pledgers
21st-century philanthropists
Aquaria founders
Jewish American philanthropists
Living people
Malcolm X Shabazz High School alumni
Pharmacists from New Jersey
Businesspeople from Newark, New Jersey
Rutgers University alumni
The Home Depot people
21st-century American Jews